Rafael Lawrence Behr (born June 1974) has been a columnist at The Guardian since 2014, and is former political editor of the New Statesman.
Born in England, he is from a Jewish family from South Africa and as a child spent summer with relatives in Israel. He is an atheist.

Rafael Behr has worked at the Financial Times, The Observer, the New Statesman and The Guardian. In 2014, Behr was named political commentator of the year at the 2014 Comment Awards. In 2019, he was shortlisted for the same award once again.

Behr presents Politics on the Couch, a podcast about the psychology of politics.

In December 2019, Behr suffered a heart attack.

Views
Behr maintains Rishi Sunak "promised “integrity, professionalism and accountability”, making traits that should come as standard sound like innovations. He also said he would “bring compassion” to Downing Street, acknowledging its absence under his predecessor."  Then, Berh maintains Sunak appointed Suella Braverman as Home Secretary despite her repeated breaches of information security and Braverman allowing overcrowding at a detention centre for asylum seekers.  Behr maintains Sunak understands only finance and has little experience of other aspects of being a Prime Minister.  Behr maintains Sunak did not understand the 2022 United Nations Climate Change Conference would have given him the chance to appear on the world stage.  Later Sunak changed his mind and decided he would attend the COP27 conference after all.

References

External links 

 Rafael Behr | The Guardian
 Rafael Behr | New Statesman
Politics on the Couch podcast

British political journalists
The Guardian journalists
The Observer people
Living people
1974 births